Airdrie may refer to: 

Airdrie, North Lanarkshire, a town in Scotland
Airdrieonians F.C., an association football club based in Airdrie, North Lanarkshire
Airdrieonians F.C. (1878), a former association football club based in Airdrie, North Lanarkshire
Airdrie, Alberta, a city in Canada
Airdrie (electoral district), a provincial political division representing the Alberta city
Airdrie (Nashville, Tennessee), a historic house in Nashville, Tennessee, United States